The 1972–73 Austrian Hockey League season was the 43rd season of the Austrian Hockey League, the top level of ice hockey in Austria. Eight teams participated in the league, and EC KAC won the championship.

Regular season

External links
Austrian Ice Hockey Association

Austrian Hockey League seasons
Aus 
Aust